The Orkney Hood  is an Iron Age garment, now in the collection of National Museums Scotland. It is in the form of a woollen hood with tablet~woven trim and fringe.

The hood was found in 1867, in a peat bog in St. Andrew's parish on Orkney.

References

Further reading 

 Majorie Findlayson: 'Report on the conservation of the Orkney Hood'. In: Tom Bryce, Jim Tate (eds): 'The Laboratories of the National Museum of Scotland 2', 1984, National Museum of Scotland, Edinburg, pp. 95–96
 Gabra-Sanders, Thea: 'The Orkney Hood, Re-Dated and Re-Considered'. in Rogers, P.W., Jorgensen,L.B. & Rast-Eicher, A. (eds)  'The Roman Textile Industry and its Influence, a birthday tribute to John Peter Wild', 2001, Oxford: Oxbow. Pp 98–104, .
 Gale R. Owen-Crocker: 'Orkney Hood'. In: 'Encyclopedia of Medieval Dress and Textiles'. Brill Online, 2015. 
.

Iron Age Scotland
History of Orkney
Individual hats
Collections of the National Museums of Scotland